Miss Chinese Vancouver Pageant (Chinese: 溫哥華華裔小姐競選), also known as MCV and formerly branded as Miss Chinese (Vancouver) Pageant, is an annual beauty pageant organized by Fairchild TV that selects Vancouver's representative for the annual Miss Chinese International Pageant that is held in Hong Kong, organized by TVB. The current Miss Chinese Vancouver is Yi Yi Wang (王一亦) winner of the 2022 pageant.  

The pageant replaced the Miss Vancouver Chinatown Pageant, which selected Vancouver's representatives to the Miss Chinese International Pageant from 1988 to 1995. It is one of the most recognized beauty pageants among Chinese Canadian diaspora, alongside its Toronto counterpart. In 2020, the Miss Chinese (Vancouver) Pageant was rebranded as the Miss Chinese Vancouver Pageant.

History
The pageant began in 1995. Contestants must be of at least partial Chinese descent and have resided in Canada for continuous period of 6 months on the day the application form is signed. The age requirement is 17-27 (expanded in 2011). The contestants must have never been married or pregnant or committed a crime. The pageant is held at the Vancouver Convention Centre in December of every year. However, in 2009 the location was moved to the River Rock Casino Resort in Richmond, British Columbia due to the media currently taking place at the Vancouver Convention Centre for the Vancouver 2010 Winter Games.

Masters of ceremonies
1995: Lawrence Cheng 鄭丹瑞, Deborah Moore 狄寶娜摩亞
1996: Lawrence Cheng 鄭丹瑞, Dominic Lam 林嘉華
1997: Lawrence Cheng 鄭丹瑞, Dominic Lam 林嘉華
1998: Dominic Lam 林嘉華
1999: Dominic Lam 林嘉華, Eva Yang 楊宜文, Walter Ngai 倪啟瑞
2000: Dominic Lam 林嘉華, Sam Wong 黃植森, Eric Li 李潤庭
2001: Dominic Lam 林嘉華, Walter Ngai 倪啟瑞, Crystal Pan 潘欣欣, Natalie Au 區念慈, Delon Lew 廖德隆
2002: Dominic Lam 林嘉華, Eva Yang 楊宜文, Crystal Pan 潘欣欣
2003: Dominic Lam 林嘉華, Eva Yang 楊宜文, Annabelle Louie 雷安娜
2004: Dominic Lam 林嘉華, Eva Yang 楊宜文, Anita Lee 李婉華
2005: Stephen Au 區錦棠, Eva Yang 楊宜文, Anita Lee 李婉華, Ricky Cheung 張文謙
2006: Joey Leung 梁榮忠, Anita Lee 李婉華, Ricky Cheung 張文謙
2007: Amigo Choi 崔建邦, Anita Lee 李婉華, Ricky Cheung 張文謙
2008: Dominic Lam 林嘉華, Gregory Charles Rivers 河國榮, Brian Chan 陳本岡, Tsui Li Hsin 崔麗心
2009: Stephen Huynh 黃長興, Lora Sun 孫青青, Brian Chan 陳本岡
2010: Patrick Tang 鄧健泓, Brian Chan 陳本岡, Gerald Yang 楊飛
2011: Jason Chan 陳智燊, Tsui Li Hsin 崔麗心, Brian Chan 陳本岡
2012: Sunny Chan 陳錦鴻, Mandy Jin 金夢宜, Ricky Cheung 張文謙
2013: Anna Yau 丘凱敏, Ricky Cheung 張文謙, Fred Liu 劉津
2014: William Hu 胡渭康, Ricky Cheung 張文謙, Fred Liu 劉津
2015: Anne Heung 向海嵐, Fred Liu 劉津
2016: Vinci Wong 王賢誌, Fred Liu 劉津
2017: Fred Liu 劉津, Delon Lew 廖德隆
2018: Fred Liu 劉津, BChiu 趙穎䝼, Jack Wu 胡諾言
2019: BChiu 趙穎䝼, Delon Lew 廖德隆, Tingting Niu 牛婷婷
2020: BChiu 趙穎䝼, Chris Yuen 袁號殷

Special performing guests
1995: Sandra Lang 仙杜拉
1996: Angus Tung 童安格
1997: Info Not Available
1998: Info Not Available
1999: Jade Kwan 關惠文, Ya-Wen Wang 王亞文
2000: Teresa Carpio 杜麗莎
2001: Public Dreams Society, Benny Yau 邱穟恆, Cindy Cheung 張瑋恩, Rebecca Yang 楊詠薇, Jenny Chang 張聖伶, Abraham Siu 蕭正中, Patrick Huang 黃紹廷
2002: Public Dreams Society, Rita Leung 梁璟裕, Kitty Bao 鮑芳, Gerald Kwok 郭嘉豪
2003: Public Dreams Society, Gerald Kwok 郭嘉豪, Bella Chen 陳薇
2004: Ah Niu (Tan Kheng Seong) 阿牛(陳慶祥)
2005: Ekin Cheng 鄭伊健
2006: Anthony Lun 倫永亮
2007: Jeremy Chang 張洪量, Benny Yau 邱穟恆, Derek Chiu 趙子恆, Phil Lam 林漢輝, Luciano Goncalves, Eric Chen 陳冠勳, Jessica Cheung 張葆頤, Jessica Chow 周美蘭, Peggy Mao 毛立慈, Ginny Huang 黃瀞儀
2008: Remus Choy 蔡一傑, Bernice Liu 廖碧兒, Lini Evans 伊雲絲, Derek Chiu 趙子恆, Dionne Phillips 余迪安, Laura Tang 湯有麗, Micky Tang 鄧佑剛, Gary Yan 甄嘉亮
2009: Steven Ma 馬浚偉, Richard Yuen 袁卓凡
2010: Wong He 王喜
2011: Ruco Chan 陳展鵬
2012: Hanjin Tan 陳奐仁
2013: Justin Lo 側田
2014: Alfred Hui 許廷鏗
2015: Alex Hung 洪杰
2016: Mak Cheung Ching 麥長青
2017: Joel Chan 陳山聰
2018: Lok-yi Lai 黎諾懿
2019: Matthew Ho 何廣沛
2020: Pakho Chau (virtual due to COVID-19 pandemic)

Past pageant results

Major award winners

a ^ 'Originally, the Second Runner-Up of 2010 was Linda Wang 王冠.  However, she relinquished the title in May 2011 due to personal reasons and 4th place Jessie Li was awarded the title.Other award winners

MCV at Miss Chinese International Pageant
Vancouver has generally been fairly successful at the Miss Chinese International Pageant (MCI) despite not placing in the top 3 until 1993, when Miss Vancouver Chinatown 1992, Elaine Barbara Der finished as 2nd runner up. In 2001, Miss Chinese Vancouver produced Vancouver's first MCI winner, Bernice Liu. Liu later joined TVB and is currently an actress. She was succeeded by Shirley Zhou in 2002.  Linda Chung and Leanne Li then both won the Miss Chinese International 2004 and 2005 titles, represectively. Vancouver has produced 7 winners and including two back-to-back wins (2001 and 2002; 2004 and 2005), a record no other city has yet to break.Note: The winners from 1987 to 1994 (competing at Miss Chinese International 1988 to 1995) are Miss Vancouver Chinatown', the pageant that was replaced by MCV.

1 Age at the time of the Miss Chinese International pageantNote: This chart only reflects Miss Chinese International Pageant contestants that were winners of Miss Chinese (Vancouver) Pageant, not of Miss Vancouver Chinatown Pageant, which is a separate pageant altogether.''

See also
Miss Chinese Toronto Pageant
Miss Chinese International Pageant
Miss NY Chinese
Miss Vancouver Chinatown

References

External links
Miss Chinese ( Vancouver ) Pageant 2010 Official Site
Miss Chinese ( Vancouver ) Pageant 2008 Official Site
Miss Chinese ( Vancouver ) Pageant 2007 Official Site
Miss Chinese ( Vancouver ) Pageant 2006 Official Site
Miss Chinese ( Vancouver ) Pageant 2005 Official Site
Miss Chinese ( Vancouver ) Pageant 2004 Official Site
Pageant Organizer Fairchild Television Official Website
Miss Chinese ( Vancouver ) Pageant Contestants & More

Vancouver
Chinese-Canadian culture in Vancouver
Beauty pageants in Canada
1995 establishments in British Columbia
Events in Vancouver